Alocasia baginda, the dragon scale plant, is a species of flowering plant in the family Araceae, native to Kalimantan, Indonesia. As a houseplant it is rare in commerce, with the unimproved species, and the cultivars 'Pink Dragon' and the smaller 'Silver Dragon' (which may be a hybrid) occasionally available.

References

baginda
House plants
Flora of Kalimantan
Plants described in 2011